The Women's 200m Freestyle competition of the swimming events at the 1979 Pan American Games took place on 3 July at the Piscina Olimpica Del Escambron in San Juan, Puerto Rico. The last Pan American Games champion was Kim Peyton of the United States.

This race consisted of four lengths of the pool, all in freestyle.

Results
All times are shown in minutes and seconds.

Heats
The first round was held on July 3.

Final 
The final was held on July 3.

References

Swimming at the 1979 Pan American Games